Connally may refer to:

People
 John Connally (1917–1993), 39th Governor of Texas (1963-1969); 61st U.S. Secretary of Treasury
 Merrill Connally (1921–2001), American film actor, county administrative judge, and rancher
 Nellie Connally (1919–2006), First Lady of Texas from 1963 to 1969
 Tom Connally (1877–1963), American politician
 Wayne Connally (1923–2000), American politician and rancher
 Connally Edozien (born 1978), Nigerian soccer player
 Connally Findlay Trigg (1847–1907), Confederate serviceman and US congressman
 Connally Findlay Trigg (judge) (1810–1880), United States federal judge

Places
 Connally Building, an Atlanta, Georgia hotel built in 1916
 Connally High School (Waco, Texas), a public high school
 Connally Independent School District, a public school district based in the northernmost part of Waco, Texas
 John B. Connally Unit, a maximum-security prison for males located in unincorporated Karnes County, Texas

Other
 Connally Hot Oil Act of 1935, US legislation
 Connally v. General Construction Co., a United States Supreme Court case concerning the Fifth Amendment's due process doctrine
 Interstate 410 (also the Connally Loop), a loop route of Interstate 10 around San Antonio, Texas

See also
 Connolly (disambiguation)
 Connelly (disambiguation)